Alison MacLeod is a Canadian-British literary fiction writer.  She is most noted for her 2013 novel Unexploded, a longlisted nominee for the 2013 Man Booker Prize, and her 2017 short story collection All the Beloved Ghosts, a shortlisted finalist for the Governor General's Award for English-language fiction at the 2017 Governor General's Awards.  MacLeod is an occasional contributor to BBC Radio 4, the Sunday Times and the Guardian, and has appeared at numerous literary festivals in the UK and internationally.

Her debut novel The Changeling, 1996, is the story of the 18th-century historical figure, Anne Bonny, a cross-dressing woman who was sentenced to hang for piracy. The Wave Theory of Angels, 2005, explored an actual 13th-century theological uproar and in a parallel storyline, controversies in the early 21st-century world of particle physics. Her 2007 short story collection, Fifteen Modern Tales of Attraction, delves into the complications of desire.  

In 2013, she received international attention for her third novel Unexploded, which was long-listed for the 2013 Man Booker Prize for Fiction. Adapted for BBC Radio and named one of the Observer Books of the Year, it presents a non-triumphalist perspective on the early years of the second world war in Britain confronting the bigotry that can unfold at times of national strife. Described as ‘a piece of finely wrought ironwork, uncommonly delicate but at the same time astonishingly strong and tensile; it’s a novel of staggering elegance and beauty.’ and ‘Like her modernist forebears, Macleod knows that life and death, the terrible and the mundane always co-exist – her genius lies in illustrating these truths while simultaneously spinning a bona fide pageturner.’  Unexploded was followed by a short story collection, All the Beloved Ghosts, 2017, named one of the Guardian‘s "Best Books of 2017," an "exceptionally accomplished collection" blends fiction, biography and memoir. 

In Tenderness, 2021, MacLeod "pulls off a magnificent nonlinear spin on Lady Chatterley’s Lover and the censorship of literature during D.H. Lawrence’s life and beyond... this places MacLeod among the best of contemporary novelists." by tracing "Lady Chatterley’s sources in the thickets of Lawrence’s own biography, then follows its tortured progress towards the light through the indecency trial," where in her last days before becoming first lady, Jackie Kennedy, to honor a novel she loves, attends the trial." Tenderness, originally a working title for Lawrence's novel, was on the NY Times "Best Historical Novels of 2021" and "The Season’s Best New Historical Novels" lists.

Background
Born in Montreal, Quebec of Nova Scotian parents and raised in Montreal and Halifax, Nova Scotia, she has lived in Brighton, England since 1987. MacLeod studied English literature at Mount Saint Vincent University in Halifax and later, completed her masters in creative writing and Ph.D at the University of Lancaster. She is published by Bloomsbury and Penguin Canada, and is a professor of contemporary fiction at the University of Chichester. She is a citizen of both Canada and the United Kingdom.

Awards
 2016 Eccles British Library Writer in Residence Award
 2013 Man Booker Prize Longlist for Unexploded,  Hamish Hamilton
 2011 BBC National Short Story Award Shortlist for The Heart of Dennis Noble

Selected bibliography
The Changeling, St. Martin's Press, 1996, 
The Wave Theory of Angels, Penguin Canada,  2005, 
Fifteen Modern Tales of Attraction, Penguin Books, 2007, 
Unexploded, Hamish Hamilton, 2013, 
All the Beloved Ghosts, Bloomsbury Publishing, 2017, 
Tenderness, Bloomsbury Publishing, 2021,

References

External links

 Alison MacLeod's top 10 stories about infidelity from The Guardian 
  No Excess Baggage for The Sunday Times "Ahead of the naming of the winner of this year's EFG Private Bank award at the festival, Alison MacLeod considers what we can learn from the greatest short stories."

21st-century British novelists
21st-century British short story writers
21st-century Canadian novelists
21st-century Canadian short story writers
British women novelists
British women short story writers
Canadian women novelists
Canadian women short story writers
Writers from Montreal
Canadian emigrants to the United Kingdom
Living people
21st-century Canadian women writers
Canadian expatriate writers
Year of birth missing (living people)